The men's 50 metre miniature rifle was a shooting sports event held as part of the Shooting at the 1924 Summer Olympics programme. It was the third appearance of the event. The competition was held on 23 June 1924 at the shooting ranges at Reims. 66 shooters from 19 nations competed.

Records
These were the standing world and Olympic records prior to the 1924 Summer Olympics.

There was no official world record registered.

Pierre Coquelin de Lisle set a new Olympic record with 398 rings.

Results

A maximum of four competitors per nation were allowed.

References

External links
 Official Report
 

Shooting at the 1924 Summer Olympics
Men's 050m prone 1924